is one of the eleven wards in the city of Kyoto, in Kyoto Prefecture, Japan.  Its name means "North Ward." As of 2020, the ward has an estimated population of 117,165 people.

Hiragino typeface is named after an area in the ward.

Demographics

Education

Universities
Bukkyo University
Kyoto Sangyo University
Ritsumeikan University, Kinugasa Campus
Otani University

Primary and secondary schools

The community previously had a North Korean school, Kyoto Korean No. 3 Elementary School (京都朝鮮第三初級学校).

Culture 
 Kyoto Museum for World Peace
 Ōtani University Museum
 Museum of Furuta Oribe

Temples and Landmarks
Daitoku-ji a famous Rinzai sect temple.
Kamigamo Shrine, one of the oldest shrines in Japan.
Kinkaku-ji, the Golden Pavilion, one of Japan's most famous temples.
Imamiya Shrine, an ancient Shinto shrine dedicated to healing.
Shinnyō-ji, a sub temple of Shōkoku-ji, famous for spring Iris blossoms.

References

External links

  

Wards of Kyoto